Under the Tree is a 2017 Icelandic dark comedy drama film directed by Hafsteinn Gunnar Sigurðsson. It was screened in the Contemporary World Cinema section at the 2017 Toronto International Film Festival. The film was selected as the Icelandic entry for the Best Foreign Language Film at the 90th Academy Awards, but did not get nominated.

Plot
Konrad and Eybjorg complain to their neighbours Inga and Baldvin that their tree casts a shadow over their backyard patio. This ignites a feud that escalates exponentially, leading to a tragic yet comedic ending.

Cast
 Steinþór Hróar Steinþórsson as Atli
 Edda Björgvinsdóttir as Inga
 Sigurður Sigurjónsson as Baldvin
 Þorsteinn Bachmann as Konrad
 Lára Jóhanna Jónsdóttir as Agnes
 Selma Björnsdóttir as Eybjorg

Reception
On review aggregator Rotten Tomatoes, the film holds an approval rating of 84% based on 25 reviews, with an average rating of 7.2/10. On Metacritic, the film has a weighted average score of 75 out of 100 based on 12 reviews, indicating "generally favorable reviews".

See also
 List of submissions to the 90th Academy Awards for Best Foreign Language Film
 List of Icelandic submissions for the Academy Award for Best Foreign Language Film

References

External links
 
 
 
 

2017 films
2017 comedy-drama films
Films about trees
Icelandic comedy-drama films
2010s Icelandic-language films